Jimmy James is the stage name of James A. Fyke (born June 27, 1959), an American musician. He is a multi instrumentalist and a singer-songwriter.

Early life, family and education

James is from Colonia, New Jersey. He received a bachelor of Music degree from University of Tampa in 1981. In college, he was president of honorary music fraternity Kappa Kappa Psi.

Career
James originally played the bass in the rock band Tommy Tutone, later switching to guitar and drums and performing the role of band leader.

He has played bass with Animotion, keyboards with Mike Tramp (White Lion), and guitar with Bad Company featuring Brain Howe. James has written rock music shows for theme parks such as Busch Gardens, Opryland, Fiesta Texas and for Disney. He has performed with acts that include Fabian, The Coasters, The Marvellettes, and Lou Christie. He has performed solo acoustic guitar throughout Europe, supporting acts such as Kip Winger and Eric Martin (Mr. Big). Additionally, James has had a solo singer-songwriter career.

Product endorsements
James has product endorsements with Orange Amplifiers, Marshall Amplifiers, Ampeg Amplifiers, Gibson Guitars, Kubicki basses, Hammond organs, Rick Turner guitars and Clayton guitar picks.

Personal life
Jimmy James resides in Tampa, Florida.

Solo albums
 All Talk / No Action (1999)
 Solace in the Sun (2015)
 80's Remaster  (2021)

Collaborations
 80's Hits Stripped  (2005)
 Santa I Got Your Number Tommy Tutone (2010)

References

1959 births
Living people
Guitarists from Florida
Songwriters from New Jersey
Guitarists from New Jersey
American male guitarists
People from Woodbridge Township, New Jersey
University of Tampa alumni
American male songwriters